Afrim Bilali (born 8 September 1979) is an Albanian professional basketball player who played for Kamza Basket in the Albanian Basketball League. He was a member of the Albania national basketball team between 2002 and 2013 and he is the current coach of the national team.  His top score is 55 points 14 rebounds and 7 assist.He also has 5 MVP trophies and is the head coach of Beselidhja Basket. He dropped a 30 point triple double against England on a friendly match.

References

1979 births
Living people
Albanian men's basketball players
Basketball players from Shkodër
Guards (basketball)